Weston Ranch is a subdivision of modest tract homes located in the southwestern corner of Stockton, California. It is approximately 1 hour away from the San Francisco Bay Area. The community is located just west of interstate highway 5, the San Joaquin River bordering its North and West sides, and French Camp Road bordering the south.

Schools
The schools in Weston Ranch are part of the Manteca Unified School District and consists of three elementary schools; August Knodt, George Y. Komure, and Great Valley, and two high schools; Weston Ranch High School and New Vision.

Location:

Geography of San Joaquin County, California
Stockton, California